Gabriel Kazu Rossato Yanagu (born 9 June 1999), commonly known as Kazu, is a Brazilian footballer who plays as a midfielder for Avaí.

Early life
Kazu was born in Japan to Brazilian parents: his father is of Japanese descent, and his mother of Italian descent. His parents were injured in a car accident in 1998, and spent their life savings to pay the hospital bills. Kazu's father moved his family to his ancestral Japan to work as dekasegis to rebuild their life. Kazu was born in Seki, Japan, and named after the Japanese international footballer Kazuyoshi Miura.

Career

Flamengo
On 14 February 2018 Flamengo signed Kazu from Luverdense  on a free transfer, although the two parts agreed that Luverdense would keep 30% of this economic rights. In his first year at the club he was kept as a member of the under-20 team.

Tombense
Kazu left Flamengo at the end of 2019 where his contract expired and had already signed a pre-contract with Tombense in December 2019. He was immediately loaned out to Paraná Clube for the 2020 season.

International career
Kazu was called up to the Brazil under-20 squad for the 2017 Toulon Tournament. He played 45 minutes before being replaced by Igor in a 1–0 win over Indonesia.

Career statistics

Club

Notes

References

External links

1999 births
Living people
Association football people from Gifu Prefecture
Brazilian footballers
Brazil youth international footballers
Japanese footballers
Association football midfielders
Brazilian people of Japanese descent
Brazilian people of Italian descent
Japanese people of Brazilian descent
Japanese people of Italian descent
Campeonato Brasileiro Série A players
Campeonato Brasileiro Série B players
Luverdense Esporte Clube players
CR Flamengo footballers
Tombense Futebol Clube players
Paraná Clube players
Avaí FC players
Campeonato Paranaense players